The 2006 Sports Network Cup was a college football postseason NCAA Division I FCS Mid-Major Championship Series. The San Diego Toreros finished ahead of Monmouth Hawks 20–0 in first places votes to be named the NCAA Division I FCS Mid-Major Football National Champions.

Dropped Out: None
Others receiving votes (in order of points, minimum of five required): Marist (5)

Note: Voting was conducted by a panel of 112 FCS media members and media relations professionals. A first-place vote is worth five points, a second- place vote is worth four points, a third-place vote is worth three points, a fourth-place vote is worth two points, and a fifth-place vote is worth one point. Votes were due by Wednesday, November 22, 2006, following the final week of the regular season. Postseason play has no effect on the outcome of the awards.

See also
NCAA Division I FCS Consensus Mid-Major Football National Championship

References

External links
https://web.archive.org/web/20150627035927/http://sportsnetwork.com/merge/tsnform.aspx?c=sportsnetwork&page=cfoot2%2Fmisc%2F2006_awards_voting.htm#cup

College football championship trophies